Anthony Barnes Mahoney (September 12, 1893 – September 25, 1924) was an American Negro league pitcher in the 1920s.

A native of Charles County, Maryland, Mahoney served in the United States Armed Forces during World War I. He made his Negro leagues debut in 1921 with the Brooklyn Royal Giants and Indianapolis ABCs. He played for Indianapolis again the following season, then finished his career in 1923 with the Baltimore Black Sox. Mahoney died in Washington, D.C., in 1924 at age 31.

References

External links
 and Baseball-Reference Black Baseball stats and Seamheads

1893 births
1924 deaths
Baltimore Black Sox players
Brooklyn Royal Giants players
Indianapolis ABCs players
Baseball pitchers
Baseball players from Maryland
People from Charles County, Maryland
20th-century African-American sportspeople
African Americans in World War I